The Altamont Corridor Express (also known as  ACE, formerly Altamont Commuter Express) is a commuter rail service in California, connecting Stockton and San Jose during peak hours only. ACE is named for the Altamont Pass, through which it runs. Service is managed by the San Joaquin Regional Rail Commission, and operations are contracted to Herzog Transit Services. The  route includes ten stops, with travel time about 2 hours and 12 minutes end-to-end. ACE uses Bombardier BiLevel Coaches, MPI F40PH-3C locomotives, and Siemens Charger locomotives.

Service began on October 19, 1998, with two weekday round trips. A third round trip was added in May 2001, followed by a fourth round trip in October 2012. Saturday service commenced in September 2019. , average weekday ridership is 5,900.

The tracks are owned by Union Pacific Railroad, previously built along the Western Pacific Railroad main line. Under the ACEforward program, a number of improvements to the service are being considered. These include a rerouted line through Tracy, an extension to Modesto and Merced, and connections to BART at Union City and Tri-Valley.

History and funding

Planning 

By the 1980s, three rapidly growing areas in California – Silicon Valley, the Tri-Valley, and the San Joaquin Valley – were poorly connected by public transit, as Interstate 580 and Interstate 680 became more congested. Commuting from the San Joaquin Valley or the Tri-Valley to Silicon Valley required using a car or limited bus service.

In 1989, the San Joaquin Council of Governments, Stockton Chamber of Commerce, and the Building Industry Association of the Delta started work on a 20-year transportation plan for the northern section of the San Joaquin Valley. In November 1990, San Joaquin County voters passed Measure K, a half-cent sales tax to fund a variety of transportation improvements. The highest-priority project was the establishment of passenger rail service to San Jose.

In 1995, San Joaquin County and seven cities along the route formed the San Joaquin Regional Rail Commission (SJRRC) to oversee the creation of the service. In May 1997, the Altamont Commuter Express Joint Powers Authority (ACE JPA) was formed by the SJRRC, Santa Clara Valley Transportation Authority (VTA), and Alameda Congestion Management Agency (ACMA). That agreement formalized financial support, administrative processes, and governance for the rail service. The operation is funded by a variety of state and federal sources, largely sales tax revenue collected by the three JPA signatories, while farebox revenues account for about one-third of costs.

Cost sharing for capital projects, excluding stations, during the initial 36 months of service was determined by the JPA on a case-by-case basis and approved by each of the member agencies. The initial purchase of rolling stock, construction of stations, and other start-up costs, amounting to some $48 million, were covered primarily by Measure K funds. Station improvements are the responsibility of the county in which the station is located. ACE pays the Union Pacific Railroad about $1.5 million per year to use their tracks. Service began on October 19, 1998, with two daily round trips running to San Jose in the morning and Stockton in the evening.

Service expansion 

The original service used two trainsets, each with four bilevel coach cars, for a total seated capacity of 1,120 passengers in each direction daily. In September 1999, less than a year after opening, the service reached 1,000 daily riders per direction, near full capacity.

With that success, the agency wanted to add additional runs. To enable more trains on the line, ACE funded $3 million in track improvements, but the limited amount of equipment only allowed ACE to add a morning "short turn" run between San Jose and Pleasanton. This "turn-back train" started service on February 21, 2000, and gave Pleasanton and Fremont a third inbound train to alleviate the crowding on the two earlier trains. Even with the added capacity, by early 2001 ACE was regularly carrying more than 700 daily standees.

ACE purchased additional equipment, allowing the "turn-back train" to operate to Lathrop/Manteca station, nearly the full length of the route, beginning on March 5, 2001; trains also began stopping at Santa Clara station. Although the third train added 560 seats in each direction, it brought an immediate increase of 380 daily riders.

ACE then planned to add a fourth round trip later in the year, with fifth and sixth round trips by 2006. However, by late 2001, the deepening dot-com recession was severely hurting ridership, and expansion plans were put on hold. On June 30, 2003, the ACE JPA was dissolved in favor of a Cooperative Services Agreement between the three member agencies.

On January 6, 2003, ACE introduced the Stockton Solution Shuttle, allowing Stockton passengers to use the ACE trip which terminated at Lathrop/Manteca. The trip was extended to Stockton on August 1, 2005. At that time, service to Santa Clara was suspended to allow for the construction of a second platform and pedestrian tunnel at the station.

On August 28, 2006, ACE added a fourth round trip, which operated midday using one of the existing trainsets. On November 7, 2006, San Joaquin County voters approved a 20-year extension of Measure K. Suffering from reducing funding due to the Great Recession, ACE cut the lightly used midday trip on November 2, 2009. On May 14, 2012, ACE restored service to Santa Clara station. On October 1, 2012, a fourth rush-hour round trip was added, running approximately one hour after existing trips.

Altamont Corridor Express 

In December 2012, the service was rebranded from Altamont Commuter Express to Altamont Corridor Express to reflect plans for a broader scope of service.

In March 2014, ACE opened a $65 million,  maintenance facility in Stockton. On July 1, 2015, management and governance of the San Joaquin passed from Caltrans to the new San Joaquin Joint Powers Authority. The SJJPA has nominal control over the SJRRC, but delegates all responsibility over ACE to the SJRRC.

On March 7, 2016, an ACE train was derailed by a mudslide in Niles Canyon near Sunol. The front car plunged into the rain-swollen Alameda Creek. Fourteen passengers were injured, but there were no fatalities.

ACE received Road Repair and Accountability Act funds in order to initiate Saturday service in January 2018, with two Saturday round trips added in September 2019.

Future plans 

In association with the California High-Speed Rail project, the ACE line is planned to be dramatically upgraded and expanded. Beginning around 2008, initial plans called for the Altamont Corridor Rail Project to produce a high speed rail "Super ACE" capable of halving the travel time between the endpoints.

As the high-speed rail project was scaled back and rerouted to Pacheco Pass several years later, these plans were replaced with the more modest ACEforward program. The San Joaquin Regional Rail Commission issued a notice of intent to proceed with an Environmental Impact Statement in June 2013; this was released in 2017 and prioritized goals as either long term or short term. Short term goals included track improvements, a possible reroute through downtown Tracy including new stations, a West Tracy station, and a new extension to Modesto in addition to additional daily round trips. Long term goals included upgrades to the existing corridor to allow as many as 10 daily round trips, extension to Merced and electrification of the line from Stockton to San Jose.

Also under studied were possible connections with BART at Union City or the Tri-Valley via traditional ACE rail, diesel multiple units, or bus bridges. This connection is planned to be facilitated by the Tri-Valley-San Joaquin Valley Regional Rail Authority.

Altamont Corridor Vision 
The state senate allocated $400 million in revenue from a gas tax increase to ACEforward expansion. ACE was awarded $500.5 million in April 2018 for expanded service to Ceres and Sacramento to provide more rail service and connections within the Central Valley. Service is expected to begin from Ceres by 2023 with interim bus bridge service to Merced until that segment of Union Pacific right-of-way is upgraded. Four trains will depart Ceres in the mornings, and one train may make the complete run to San Jose with others transferring passengers at North Lathrop.

By 2019, the plan had come to be called the Altamont Corridor Vision, with an expected price of $9.7 billion, allowing ACE to run up to six weekday round trips in 2023 with the goal of ten weekday round trips once additional track infrastructure is completed. ACE and the Tri-Valley-San Joaquin Valley Regional Rail Authority sought funding to construct a shared tunnel under Altamont pass in order to speed service and increase reliability. The Union Pacific right of way between Ceres and Lathrop will be double tracked to facilitate passenger service.  platforms are being extended to accommodate longer trains.

Valley Rail 
Valley Rail is the project to route ACE and Amtrak San Joaquins along the little-used Sacramento Subdivision between Stockton and Sacramento. Six new stations would be constructed along the line with a layover facility at Natomas. Trains would run the length of the line from Natomas to San Jose or Ceres with a midday short turn to Stockton. A Draft Environmental Impact Statement was released in 2020, with services expected to begin no later than 2023. The North Elk Grove station was eliminated from planning in September 2020. The project received funding via California's Transit and Intercity Rail Capital Program in 2023, by which time the project was expected to open in phases beginning in 2025. Later that year, the estimated commencement of service to Ceres and Natomas were again pushed back to 2026, with service to Merced and infill stations opening by 2030.

Service 

, ACE operates four round trips per weekday in the peak rush hour directions – westbound (to San Jose) in the morning and eastbound (to Stockton) in the evening.

ACE did not operate on weekends or major holidays until September 7, 2019, when two Saturday round trips were added.

Route 

From San Jose to just north of Santa Clara, ACE uses the Caltrain main line (Peninsula Subdivision), shared with Caltrain and Amtrak service. From Santa Clara to Stockton – the majority of the route – ACE runs on Union Pacific Railroad freight lines. From Santa Clara to Newark, ACE uses the Coast Subdivision, then the Niles Subdivision to Niles. From Niles to Lathrop, the line uses the Oakland Subdivision. From Lathrop to Stockton, the line uses the Fresno Subdivision.

The route runs through Niles Canyon, parallel to the Niles Canyon Railway, Highway 84, and the Hetch Hetchy Aqueduct. This tunnel was modified from its original configuration to accommodate intermodal double-stack freight trains. The San Joaquin Regional Rail Commission plans to rehabilitate the tunnel.

East of Pleasanton and Livermore, the line runs through the Altamont Pass on the original Feather River Route. After crossing the California Aqueduct and the Delta-Mendota Canal into the Central Valley, skirting the southern edge of Tracy. It then turns north between Lathrop and Manteca and runs to Robert J. Cabral Station in Stockton.

Tickets and fares 
ACE tickets are available at select stations and on ACE's web site. Distance-based fares are available in one way, round trip, 20 trip, and monthly passes. Unlike other commuter services, such as Caltrain, ACE does not accept the widly-accepted Clipper Card.

Rolling stock 

ACE operates push-pull trains with one to two diesel locomotives and four to eight bilevel coach cars. Trains typically operate with the locomotive(s) leading westbound and the cab car leading eastbound.

ACE has ordered 17 additional Bombardier BiLevel cars (5 cab cars and 12 coaches). Deliveries were expected to begin sometime in 2021. The entire fleet of Bombardier bilevel coach cars and MPI F40PH-3C locomotives will be rebuilt, overhauled, and repainted to have a matching paint scheme, except for two F40PH locomotives that were retired in May 2020. They will then continue to operate along with the newer Siemens Charger SC-44 locomotives, which entered service in 2020.

See also 
 List of San Francisco Bay Area trains

References

External links 

Official Altamont Corridor Express website
ACEforward projects
San Joaquin Regional Rail Commission website

 
California railroads
Passenger rail transportation in California
Public transportation in the San Francisco Bay Area
Public transportation in the San Joaquin Valley Area
Public transportation in Alameda County, California
Public transportation in San Joaquin County, California
Public transportation in Santa Clara County, California
Transportation in San Jose, California
Diablo Range
Fremont, California
Livermore, California
Pleasanton, California
Santa Clara, California
Stockton, California
Tracy, California
Standard gauge railways in the United States
Commuter rail in the United States
Railway lines opened in 1998
1998 establishments in California